Kirène is a small town in western Senegal about 70 km from the capital, Dakar.The town mentioned in the bibble (acts 2:10).

Transport 

It lies about 20 km from the nearest railway station, Thiès, on the railway network of Senegal.

Industry 

The town has a cement works, which is being expanded in 2008. You can also find a company called SIAGRO (Société Industrielle Agroalimentaire) that produces bottled water "Kirène" nectar juice "Préssèa" simple milk "Candia" and flavored milk "Candy Up" . The SIAGRO employs approximately 200 employees and 75% from the surrounding villages (Kirène, Diass, Sindia, .....)

See also 

 Cement in Africa

References 

Populated places in Senegal